The 2014 Nepal snowstorm disaster occurred in central Nepal during the month of October and resulted in the deaths of at least 43 people of various nationalities, including at least 21 trekkers. Injuries and fatalities resulted from unusually severe snowstorms and avalanches on and around the mountains of Annapurna and Dhaulagiri. The incident was said to be Nepal's worst trekking disaster.

Events

On 14 October 2014, a snowstorm and series of avalanches occurred on and around Annapurna and Dhaulagiri in the Manang and Mustang Districts of Nepal within the Himalaya range.   According to an unnamed expert the storm arose from Cyclone Hudhud and was the worst in a decade with almost  of snow falling within 12 hours. The storm resulted from the unusual merger of a tropical cyclone with an upper trough.

Electric power, cell phone service, and internet connections failed in the Manang District, hampering relief efforts. Trekkers in the area at the time of the storm consisted of citizens from several countries including 78 from New Zealand. One of the first calls for international assistance was raised by the Israeli embassy in Kathmandu after trapped tourists sent a hand-written note from the top of the pass with a local guide who descended the mountain. Twenty-one trekkers and guides from Nepal, Slovakia and Germany were rescued on 15 October after the avalanche the previous day. When search and rescue operations ceased on 19 October, up to 400 people had been rescued from various areas including Thorong La, the Manang and Mustang areas and the Tukuche basecamp of Mustang.

The storms resulted in the deaths of at least 43 people.  Among the dead were 21 trekkers from several countries walking the Annapurna Circuit, including two Slovak climbers at Dhaulagiri base camp, and several local Nepali mountain guides, cooks and yak herders. Up to 50 people were estimated to be missing with 175 reported to have injuries such as severe frostbite.

Legacy
Local authorities were criticised for not giving sufficient warning of approaching bad weather to the trekkers and local residents. However, some officials believe that those killed or injured were inexperienced and inadequately equipped.  The Prime Minister of Nepal, Sushil Koirala, called the loss of life “extremely tragic at a time when worldwide weather updates are available every second”, and said that weather warning systems would be improved. The Nepal Tourism Ministry said that the incident "has taught us a lesson”, and that more emergency shelters and better weather tracking and communication were needed to avert future tragedies.  Newly proposed procedures and regulations include a trekkers registry, checkpoints, GPS tracking units and mandatory use of trained local guides. However, regulations at the time required trekkers to check in at various waypoints and licensed guides were already recommended. There was no system in place at the time to inform trekkers of weather conditions en route. The Nepali Trekking Guide certification is also very basic and the training is far below the quality of the training found in developed countries and does not adequately train guides in crossing and navigating snowy terrain.

See also
 List of avalanches

References

Snowstorm disaster
2014 natural disasters
Nepal 2014
Snowstorm disaster 2014
Snowstorm 2014
Mountaineering disasters
2014 meteorology
Snowstorm disaster 2014
Snowstorm disaster 2014
October 2014 events in Asia
2014 disasters in Nepal